Harry Enos Randall OBE (31 December 1899 – 28 August 1976) was a British Labour Party politician.  He was Member of Parliament (MP) for Clitheroe from 1945 to 1950 and Gateshead West from 1955 until his retirement in 1970 (having unsuccessfully fought Mitcham in 1951).

He was a British delegate to the Council of Europe and Western European Union from 1958 to 1960 and United Kingdom Representative on the Executive Committee, United Nations  High Commission Programme for Refugees from 1965 to 1970. Later he was on the Standing Conference of British Organisations for Aid to Refugees, being Chairman of the European Committee from 1970 to 1973. He was appointed an OBE in 1972. He married in 1925 Rose Nellie, daughter of Joseph Nicholson. They had one son and two daughters.

References

External links 

1899 births
1976 deaths
Labour Party (UK) MPs for English constituencies
UK MPs 1945–1950
UK MPs 1955–1959
UK MPs 1959–1964
UK MPs 1964–1966
UK MPs 1966–1970
Officers of the Order of the British Empire
Union of Communication Workers-sponsored MPs